Damon J. Phillips is an American business strategist, entrepreneurship scholar, sociologist, and the Lambert Family Professor of Social Enterprise at Columbia Business School.

Career
Phillips graduated from Morehouse College, and holds graduate degrees from MIT and Stanford.
Before academia he worked at a family electronics manufacturing firm, which fueled his interest in business. From 1998 to 2011, he was professor at the University of Chicago Booth School of Business.

Biography 
Phillips was born on Andrews Air Force Base, outside of Washington D.C. His father was in the military, and due to this their family moved several times during Phillips' childhood. He was married to fellow Columbia Business School professor, Dr. Kathy Phillips, from August 1999 until her death in January 2020. They have two children.

Works
 Shaping Jazz, Princeton University Press, 2013.

References

External links
https://press.princeton.edu/our-authors/phillips-damon-j
https://www8.gsb.columbia.edu/cbs-directory/detail/dp2588

Living people
Year of birth missing (living people)
Morehouse College alumni
People from Prince George's County, Maryland